Ülejõe is a village in Märjamaa Parish, Rapla County, in western Estonia.

References

 

Villages in Rapla County